Harkness may refer to:

Harkness (surname)
 The Harkness Ballet
Harkness Fellowship, an international health policy fellowship
Harkness Memorial State Park, a 230-acre park and mansion in Waterford, Connecticut
Harkness rating system, a chess rating system used from 1950 to 1960.
Harkness table, a style of teaching
Harkness Tower, a Gothic structure at Yale University
Rosa 'Anne Harkness', a rose variety
 Harkness, Victoria, a western suburb of Melbourne, in the City of Melton